Becheni may refer to several villages in Romania:

 Becheni, a village in Roșia de Amaradia Commune, Gorj County
 Becheni, a village in Săuca Commune, Satu Mare County